Amrik Singh Aliwal is a grassroots Indian politician who started his political innings as the Sarpanch of Village Aliwal which falls in District Ludhiana. He was imprisoned for six months in 1994 for an agitation regarding democratic rights of the people. He was elected to the Lok Sabha, the lower house of the Parliament of India as a member of the Shiromani Akali Dal and remained the Lok Sabha member from Ludhiana for two terms. On 14 December 2021, he joined Punjab Lok Congress.

Political timeline:
 2019: Chairman, The Punjab State Federation of Cooperative Sugar Mills Ltd.
 2012–2017: Chairman, Punjab State Agro Industry Corporation Ltd.  
 2007–2017: Vice President, Shiromani Akali Dal (Punjab)
 1998–2007: General Secretary, Shiromani Akali Dal (Punjab)
 1998–1999: Member, Committee on Transport and Tourism
 1998–1999: Member, Committee on Government Assurances
 1998–1999: Member, Committee on Railways
 1998: Elected to 12th Lok Sabha
 1996–1997: Member Committee on Transport and Tourism
 1996–1997: Member Consultative Committee, Ministry of Surface Transport
 1996: Elected to 11th Lok Sabha
 1993–1998: President, All India Youth, Akali Dal
 1988–1993: Senior Vice President, All India Youth Akali Dal
 1985–1988: General Secretary, All India Youth Akali Dal   
 1985–1988: Director, Cooperative Bank, Ludhiana 
 1979–1985: District President, Ludhiana, All India Youth Akali Dal
 1979–1993: Sarpanch, Village Aliwal (15 years)

References

External links
Official biographical sketch in Parliament of India website

1958 births
Living people
Lok Sabha members from Punjab, India
India MPs 1996–1997
India MPs 1998–1999
Shiromani Akali Dal politicians
Punjab Lok Congress politicians
Bharatiya Janata Party politicians from Punjab
Indian National Congress politicians from Punjab, India